Quriwani (Quechua quri gold, Aymara -wa, -ni suffixes, "the one where it is gold", also spelled Kkorihuani) is a mountain in the northern extensions of the Cordillera Real in the Andes of Bolivia which reaches a height of approximately . It is located in the La Paz Department, Larecaja Province, Sorata Municipality. It lies north of Ch'uch'u. The small lake southwest of Quriwani is named Quriwani Machu.

References 

Mountains of La Paz Department (Bolivia)